Neospinolaelaps is a genus of mites in the family Laelapidae.

Species
 Neospinolaelaps miniopteri Zumpt & Patterson, 1952

References

Laelapidae